Santiago, (also San Iago, San Tiago, Santyago, Sant-Yago, San Thiago) is a male Spanish name that derives from the Hebrew name Jacob (Ya'akov) via "Sant Iago", "Sant Yago", "Santo Iago", or "Santo Yago", first used to denote Saint James the Great, the brother of John the Apostle.  It was also the tradition that Saint James (Santiago) had travelled to the Iberian Peninsula during his life and was buried there. The name is also complicated in Spanish in that Jaime and Jacobo are modern versions of James.

Variants of Santiago include Iago (a common Galician language name), and Thiago or Tiago (a common Portuguese language name). The common name James has many forms in Iberia, including Xacobo or Xacobe and Iago (in Galician), Jaume, Xaume (in Catalan), Jaime, Jacobo, and Diego (in Spanish). Despite being a cognate, San Diego does not refer to Saint James but to Saint Didacus of Alcalá.

"Santi" or "San" are the nicknames for Santiago, although "Sandy" is sometimes used in English-speaking countries.

People named Santiago
Santiago, a Quechan or Yuma chief in the early 1850s
Santiago Amador, Colombian road cyclist
Santiago Amodeo, Film Director and screenwriter
Santiago Bernabéu, former Real Madrid president
 Santiago Bernabéu Stadium, the stadium of Real Madrid, named after Santiago Bernabéu Yeste
Santiago Botero, Colombian cyclist
Santiago Cabrera, Chilean actor
Santiago Calatrava, Spanish architect
Santiago Cañizares, Spanish footballer
Santiago Carrillo (1915–2012), Spanish politician 
Santi Cazorla, Spanish footballer
Santiago Espinal (born 1994), Dominican Republic professional baseball player
Santiago Fernández (footballer, born 1985), a Mexican football player
Santiago Fernández (footballer, born 1991), an Uruguayan football player
Santi Freixa, Spanish field hockey player
Santiago Giménez, Argentine-born Mexican Footballer
Santiago Iglesias, congressman from Puerto Rico
Santiago de Liniers, French-born defender of Buenos Aires in 1806-1807 and later viceroy
Santiago Lorenzo, Argentine decathlete
Santiago de Murcia, Spanish baroque guitarist and composer
Santiago Nsobeya, Equatoguinean politician
Santiago Palavecino, Argentine boxer
Santiago de la Parte, Spanish long-distance runner
Santiago Phelan, Argentine rugby player and coach
Santiago Ramón y Cajal, Spanish histologist and physician
Santiago Rodriguez, pianist and professor from Cuba
Santiago Schnell, Venezuelan scientist
Santiago Solari, Argentine footballer
Santiago de León de Caracas

Fictional characters
 Santiago (The Vampire Chronicles), a character in Anne Rice's novel Interview with the Vampire
 Don Santiago "Capitan Tiago" de los Santos, a character in Jose Rizal's novel Noli Me Tángere.
 Santiago Arnavisca, a character from the video game series Rainbow Six
 Santiago Muñez, Mexican character in the Goal movie series
 Santiago Nasar, protagonist of Gabriel García Márquez's novel Chronicle of a Death Foretold
 Santiago, main character in Paulo Coelho's novel The Alchemist
 Santiago, main character in Ernest Hemingway's novel The Old Man and the Sea
 Santiago “Jimmy” Robertson, an LAPD Newton Division Detective III  and former colleague of the titular character in the television show Bosch.
 Santiago Rivera, a character from the educational computer game series The ClueFinders
 Santiago Zavala, a character from Conversation in the Cathedral
 Santiago, main antagonist in Volver a Empezar, a 1994 Mexican telenovela
 Santiago "Tiago" Vega, main character Penny Dreadful: City of Angels, 2020 television series
Santiago, in Santiago: a Myth of the Far Future
Santiago, in the American television series Friday Night Lights
Amy Santiago, in the American television series Brooklyn Nine-Nine
Hale Santiago, in the Canadian television series Lost Girl
Colonel Corazon Santiago, in the PC strategy game Sid Meier's Alpha Centauri
Santiago, in Las ataduras by Carmen Martín Gaite

See also
 Santiago (surname)
 San Diego
 Saint James (disambiguation)

References

Spanish masculine given names

es:Santiago (nombre)